Scratch is a high-level block-based visual programming language and website aimed primarily at children as an educational tool for programming, with a target audience of ages 8 to 16. Users on the site, called Scratchers, can create projects on the website using a block-like interface. Projects can be exported to standalone HTML5, Android apps, Bundle (macOS) and EXE files using external tools. The service is developed by the MIT Media Lab, has been translated into 70+ languages, and is used in most parts of the world. Scratch is taught and used in after-school centers, schools, and colleges, as well as other public knowledge institutions. As of 15 February, 2023, community statistics on the language's official website show more than 123 million projects shared by over 103 million users, over 804 million total projects ever created (including unshared projects), and more than 95 million monthly website visits.

Scratch takes its name from a technique used by disk jockeys called "scratching", where vinyl records are clipped together and manipulated on a turntable to produce different sound effects and music. Like scratching, the website lets users mix together different media (including graphics, sound, and other programs) in creative ways by creating and 'remixing' projects, like video games, animations, music, and simulations.

Scratch 3.0

User interface 

The Scratch interface is divided into three main sections: a stage area, block palette, and a coding area to place and arrange the blocks into scripts that can be run by pressing the green flag or clicking on the code itself. Users may also create their own code blocks and they will appear in "My Blocks".

The stage area features the results (e.g., animations, turtle graphics, either in a small or normal size, with a full-screen option also available) and all sprites' thumbnails being listed in the bottom area. The stage uses x and y coordinates, with 0,0 being the stage center.

With a sprite selected at the bottom of the staging area, blocks of commands can be applied to it by dragging them from the block palette into the coding area. The Costumes tab allows users to change the look of the sprite with a vector and bitmap editor in order to create various effects, including animation. The Sounds tab allows attaching sounds and music to a sprite.

When creating sprites and also backgrounds, users can draw their own sprite manually, choose a Sprite from the library, or upload an image.

The table below shows the categories of the programming blocks:

Offline editing 
An offline "Desktop Editor" for Scratch 3.0 is available for Microsoft Windows 10 and above in the Microsoft Store, Apple's macOS, ChromeOS and Android; this allows the creation and playing of Scratch programs offline. The offline editor can also be downloaded in previous versions, such as Scratch 2.0 and Scratch 1.4 (an archive of older versions is found here).

Extensions 
In Scratch, extensions add extra blocks and features that can be used in projects. In Scratch 2.0 and 3.0, the extensions were all hardware-based. Software-based extensions were added in Scratch 3.0, such as text-to-speech voices, along with some new hardware-based extensions like the micro:bit. The extensions are listed below.

 Music
 Pen
 Video Sensing
 Text to Speech
 Translate
 Micro:bit
 LEGO Mindstorms EV3
 LEGO WeDo 2.0
 Makey Makey
 LEGO SPIKE Prime
 LEGO BOOST
 Go Direct Force & Acceleration

Physical 
 Lego Mindstorms EV3 – Control motors and receive sensor data from the Lego Mindstorms EV3
 Makey Makey – Use the Makey Makey to control projects
 Lego Education WeDo 2.0 – control motors and receive sensor data from the Lego WeDo
Lego Education SPIKE Prime – The main programming language for the Lego SPIKE Prime, including motor control and receiving sensor data
micro:bit – Use of a micro:bit to control projects
 Lego BOOST – Bring robotic creations to life
 Go Direct Force & Acceleration – Sense pull, push, motion, and spin
 Text To Speech – Make your sprites talk

Digital 
Many of the digital extensions in Scratch 3.0 used to be regular block categories that were moved to the extensions section to reduce clutter. These include:
 Music – Play digital instruments (drums, trumpets, violins, pianos, and more)
 Pen – Draw on the Stage with a variety of thicknesses and color
 Video Sensing – Detect motion with the camera

New digital extensions have also been added in collaborations with commercial companies. These include:
 Text to Speech – Converts words in a text into voice output (variety of voices, supplied by Amazon)
 Translate – Uses Google Translate to translate text from one language into a variety of other languages, including Arabic, Chinese, Dutch, English, French, Greek, Norwegian, and Japanese

Scratch Lab 
The Scratch Lab has experimental extensions by the Scratch Team, intended to explore whether the blocks may be added to the full website in the future. Experimental blocks include:
 Face Sensing – Make animated costumes and games that interact with your face.
 Animated text – Bring words to life with colors, fonts, and animations.
 New block colors - Change color of blocks to make easier to read.

Users can also create their own extensions for Scratch 3.0 using JavaScript. Although the intention for Scratch 3.0 was to allow unofficial JavaScript extensions, it was abandoned due to moderation risks. As a result, several modifications of the Scratch Engine allow JavaScript extensions to be added.

Code base 
Scratch 3.0 is a completely new JavaScript-based codebase made up of multiple components such as "Scratch-GUI," now based on a library from Blockly, "Scratch-VM," which interprets code, and "Scratch-Render," the rendering engine. The Scratch Blocks are made using Blockly.

A paper published in 2019 by NYU argues and illustrates, for coding music with Scratch, "that the music and sound blocks as currently implemented in Scratch may limit and frustrate meaningful music-making for children, the core user base for Scratch."

Community of users 

Scratch is used in many different settings: schools, museums, libraries, community centers, and homes. Scratch is designed primarily for users aged 8–16, but it is used by all ages and has a sizeable adult user base as of 2009. This wide outreach has created many surrounding communities, both physical and digital. In April 2020, the Tiobe ranking of the world's programming languages included Scratch into the top 20. According to Tiobe, there are 50 million projects written in Scratch, and every month one million new projects are added.

Educational users 
Scratch is used as the introductory language because the creation of interesting programs is relatively easy, and skills learned can be applied to other programming languages such as Python and Java.
 
Scratch is not exclusively for creating games. With the provided visuals, programmers can create animations, text, stories, music, and more. There are already many programs that students can use to learn topics in math, history, and even photography. Scratch allows teachers to create conceptual and visual lessons and science lab assignments with animations that help visualize difficult concepts. Within the social sciences, instructors can create quizzes, games, and tutorials with interactive elements. Using Scratch allows young people to understand the logic of programming and how to creatively build and collaborate.

Scratch is taught to more than 800 schools and 70 colleges of DAV organization in India and across the world.

In higher education, Scratch is used in the first week of Harvard University's CS50 introductory computer science course.

Online community 

Users of Scratch are called 'Scratchers'. Scratchers have the capability to share their projects and get feedback. Projects can be uploaded directly from the development environment to the Scratch website and any member of the community can download the full source code to study or to remix into new projects. Scratchers can also create project studios, comment, favorite, and "love" others' projects, follow other members to see their projects and activity, and share ideas. Projects range from games and animations to practical tools. Additionally, to encourage the creation and sharing amongst users, the website frequently establishes "Scratch Design Studio" challenges.

The MIT Scratch Team works to ensure that this community maintains a friendly and respectful environment for all people.

Educators have their own online community called ScratchEd, developed and supported by the Harvard Graduate School of Education. In this community, Scratch educators share stories, exchange resources, and ask questions.

Scratch Wiki 
The Scratch Wiki is a support resource for Scratch and information about its website, history, and phenomena surrounding it. Although supported by the Scratch Team (the developers of Scratch), it is primarily written by Scratch users (Scratchers) and is hosted independently of the main Scratch website. There are also other wikis using languages besides English available on the Scratch Wiki base domain.

Developers 
Both Scratch 2.0 and Scratch 3.0's GUIs are open source on GitHub, and developers may contribute to Scratch.

Roles 

There are 4 roles. The "New Scratcher" role is obtained by creating an account. The "Student" role is similar, except when the user is a student. As they progress into more social things, like loving, liking, and sharing projects, they will be asked if they want the "Scratcher" role.  The "Scratch Team" role is given out to people who moderate and develop Scratch. Scratch Team roles will have an asterisk at the end of their username.

Modifications 
Various Scratchers have created modifications unaffiliated with Scratch, the most notable ones being Turbowarp and the browser extension Scratch Addons. Additional popular modifications of Scratch include:

 Scratch to JavaScript compiler Forkphorus
 Scratch to JavaScript converter Leopard
 Box2d Physics Griffpatch Scratch GUI
  Custom stage sizes and extension loading from URLs. E羊icques

Events 
Scratch Educators can gather in person at Scratch Educator Meetups. At these gatherings, Scratch Educators learn from each other and share ideas and strategies that support computational creativity.

An annual "Scratch Week", formerly known as "Scratch Day", is declared in May each year. Community members are encouraged to host an event on or around this day, large or small, that celebrates Scratch. These events are held worldwide, and a listing can be found on the Scratch Day website. Scratch Week is a series focusing on Scratch activities on the Scratch website.

Every April Fools' Day, the Scratch Team will play pranks on users and add Easter eggs, one example being turning all the event blocks into cat versions of the same blocks. These blocks were called "cat blocks" and can be downloaded as one of the many downloadable Scratch add-ons.

History 
In the early 2000s, the  MIT Media Lab's Lifelong Kindergarten group (LLK) was developing visual programming languages targeted towards children. In 2003, Mitchel Resnick, Yasmin Kafai, and John Maeda were awarded a National Science Foundation grant for the development of a new programming environment for children to express themselves with code. The LLK, led by Mitchel Resnick, in partnership with Yasmin Kafai's team at UCLA worked closely with Computer Clubhouses in Boston and Los Angeles to develop Scratch, grounding its design in the practices and social dynamics of these after-school youth centers. It started as a basic programming language, with no labeled categories and no green flag. Similar to AgentSheets Scratch employed concepts of Tactile Programming later known as blocks-based programming. Scratch was made with the intention to teach kids to program.

The philosophy of Scratch encourages the sharing, reuse, and combination of code, as indicated by the team slogan, "Imagine, Program, Share". Users can make their own projects, or they may choose to "remix" someone else's project. Projects created and remixed with Scratch are licensed under the Creative Commons Attribution-Share Alike License. Scratch automatically gives credit to the user who created the original project and program in the top part of the project page.

Scratch was developed based on ongoing interaction with youth and staff at Computer Clubhouses. The use of Scratch at Computer Clubhouses served as a model for other after-school centers demonstrating how informal learning settings can support the development of technological fluency.
 
Scratch 2.0 was released on 9 May 2013. The update changed the look of the site and included both an online project editor and an offline editor. Custom blocks could now be defined within projects, along with several other improvements. The Scratch 2.0 Offline editor could be downloaded for Windows, Mac and Linux directly from Scratch's website, although support for Linux was later dropped. The unofficial mobile version had to be downloaded from the Scratch forums.

Scratch 3.0 was first announced by the Scratch Team in 2016. Several public alpha versions were released between then and January 2018, after which the pre-beta "Preview" versions were released. A beta version of Scratch 3.0 was released on 1 August 2018. for use on most browsers; with the notable exception of Internet Explorer.

Scratch 3.0, the first 3.x release version, was released on 2 January 2019.

Filetypes 
In Scratch 1.4, an * file was the file format used to store projects.

An * file is divided into four sections:
 "header", this 10-byte header contains the ASCII string 'ScratchV02' in versions higher than Scratch 1.2, and 'ScratchV01' in Scratch 1.2 and below
 "infoSize", encodes the length of the project's infoObjects. A 4-byte long, 32-bit, big-Endian integer.
 "infoObjects", a dictionary-format data section. It contains: "thumbnail", a thumbnail of the project's stage; "author", the username of the project's creator; "comment", the Project Notes; "history", the save and upload log; "scratch-version", the version of Scratch used to save the file;
 "contents", an object table with the Stage as the root. All objects in the program are stored here as references.

Scratch 2.0 uses the * file format. These are zip files containing a .json file as well as the contents of the Scratch project including sounds (stored as ) and images (stored as ). The image file labeled '' is always a 480x360 white image, but '' will still be the earliest non-deleted file.

The ScratchX experimental version of Scratch used the  file format.

Scratch 3.0 uses the * format, which is very similar to *, one difference being the sound.

Older versions 
 

Although the main Scratch website now runs only the current version (Scratch 3.0), the offline editors for Scratch 2.0 (and the earlier Scratch 1.4) are still available for download and can be used to create and run games locally.
 It is still possible to upload projects from the Scratch 2.0 launcher, which are immediately converted into Scratch 3.0 when uploaded to the main site. There is also an offline version of Scratch 3.0.

Technology 
The editor of Scratch 1.4 and below was written in Squeak, while its online project viewer was written in Java, and a player written in Adobe Flash was later added. Scratch 2.0 relied on Adobe Flash for the online version, and Adobe AIR for the offline editor. These have fallen out of favor, and Adobe dropped support for them at the end of 2020.

Interface 

In Scratch 2.0, the stage area is on the left side, with the programming blocks palette in the middle the coding area on the right. Extensions are in the "More blocks" section of the palette.

The blocks palette in Scratch 2.0 is made of discrete sections that are not scrollable from one to the next; the table below shows the different sections:

1.4 sounds 
Scratch 2.0 changed how sounds were imported, so many Scratch 1.4 sounds stopped working. (The project file was changed from * to *).

Extensions 

In Scratch 2.0, extensions were all hardware-based.

Features and derivatives 
Scratch uses event-driven programming with multiple active objects called sprites. Sprites can be drawn, as vector or bitmap graphics, from scratch in a simple editor that is part of Scratch, or can be imported from external sources. Scratch 3.0 only supports one-dimensional arrays, known as "lists", and floating-point scalars and strings are supported, but with limited string manipulation ability. There is a strong contrast between the powerful multimedia functions and multi-threaded programming style and the rather limited scope of the Scratch programming language.

Scratch 2.0 does not treat procedures as first class structures and has limited file I/O options with Scratch 2.0 Extension Protocol, an experimental extension feature that allows interaction between Scratch 2.0 and other programs. The Extension protocol allows interfacing with hardware boards such as Lego Mindstorms or Arduino. Scratch 2.0 was implemented in ActionScript, with an experimental JavaScript-based interpreter being developed in parallel.

Scratch 1.4 was based on Squeak, which is based on Smalltalk-80. A number of Scratch derivatives called Scratch Modifications have been created using the source code of Scratch 1.4. These programs are a variant of Scratch that normally include a few extra blocks or changes to the GUI. TurboWarp is an unofficial modification of Scratch 3.0 that improves the performance of Scratch by compiling projects to JavaScript and allows the loading of external extensions.

Snap! (Build Your Own Blocks) 
A more advanced visual programming language inspired by Scratch is Snap!, featuring first class procedures (their mathematical foundations are called also lambda calculus), first-class lists (including lists of lists), and first-class truly object-oriented sprites with prototyping inheritance, and nestable sprites, which are not part of Scratch. Snap! (previously "BYOB") was developed by Jens Mönig with documentation provided by Brian Harvey from University of California, Berkeley and has been used to teach "The Beauty and Joy of Computing" introductory course in CS for non-CS-major students. Both of them were members of the Scratch Team before designing "Snap!".

ScratchJr 
In July 2014, ScratchJr was released for iPad, and in 2016, ScratchJr for Android. Although heavily inspired by Scratch and co-led by Mitch Resnick, it is nonetheless a complete rewrite designed for younger children—targeting ages 5 through 7.

Censorship 
In August 2020, GreatFire announced that the Chinese government had blocked access to the Scratch website. At the time, it was estimated that more than three million people in China were using it. The outlet cited the fact that Macau, Hong Kong and Taiwan were listed as countries on the website.

See also 

 Blockly, an interface used by Scratch to make the code blocks.
 Snap! (programming language)
 Swift Playgrounds
 Alice (software)
 Twine (software)
 Lego Mindstorms EV3
 Kodu Game Lab
 Code.org
 Programmable Cricket
 PWCT
 Visual programming language
 Pencil Code (programming language)
 Scratch Lab

References

External links 

 
 

Dynamically typed programming languages
Visual programming languages
Educational programming languages
Free educational software
MIT Media Lab
Pedagogic integrated development environments
Smalltalk programming language family
Video game development software
Video game engines
Video game IDE
Software developer communities
Programming languages created in 2003
Computer file formats
Filename extensions
Creative Commons-licensed websites